Sin Hyeon-ju (born 2 August 1934) is a South Korean former sports shooter. He competed in two events at the 1964 Summer Olympics.

References

External links
 

1934 births
Living people
South Korean male sport shooters
Olympic shooters of South Korea
Shooters at the 1964 Summer Olympics
People from Dangjin
South Korean military personnel
Asian Games medalists in shooting
Shooters at the 1970 Asian Games
Asian Games gold medalists for South Korea
Medalists at the 1970 Asian Games
Sportspeople from South Chungcheong Province
20th-century South Korean people
21st-century South Korean people